Gérard Berliner (1956–2010) was a French actor and composer.

1956 births
2010 deaths
French male composers
Male actors from Paris
Musicians from Paris
Burials at Père Lachaise Cemetery
20th-century French male singers